Saturday Live is a televised talk show hosted by various guest presenters and broadcast live on Saturday nights. The show was broadcast during the autumn-spring season (October - April) and was created to fill the vacant Saturday night slot after the departure of The Late Late Show from Saturday to Friday nights.  It was first broadcast on RTÉ One on Saturday 25 October 1986. Saturday Live featured guest interviews and live music from guest music groups and featured a mix of serious discussion and light chat aimed at a younger audience than its main rival, The Late Late Show. The original programme ended on 11 April 1988.

(1986-1988) 

Saturday Live had a series of guest presenters, first presenter was Fergal Quinn including the leader of Fine Gael Alan Dukes, Rhonda Paisley (daughter of the Rev. Ian Paisley), soccer pundit Eamon Dunphy, industrialist Tiede Herrema and current affairs broadcaster Pat Kenny, whose own first attempt at a chat show, The Pat Kenny Show had failed. Kenny proved such a success in the Saturday Live show that he was subsequently given his own chat show under the name Kenny Live. Mary Mooney TD for Fianna Fáil presented it too. Others were Fr Michael Cleary, Bernard Loughlin, Joe Dolan, Brendan Shine, Yvonne Costelloe, Niall Toibin, Bishop Eamon Casey, Pat Ingoldsby, Ulick O’Connor, Lord Henry Mountcharles, Henry Kelly, Shay Healy, Rosemeary Smith,  Tommy Makem, Mick Lally, Ronnie Drew, Mícheál Ó Muircheartaigh, Eamon Morrissey, Joe Lynch, Stephen Roche, Bibi Baskin went on to her own chat show for 6 years in Autumn 1988 during midweek, Olivia O'Leary and Siobhán Cleary could have hosted too.

(1999-2000) 

Among the guests presenters were John Daly, Tracy Piggott, Dana and Dave Fanning.

Following Kenny's take over of The Late Late Show in 1999 and the ending of Kenny Live the Saturday Live formula was revived to fill the vacant Saturday night slot yet again.  The second coming of the show proved unpopular and was ended after only one series.

1986 Irish television series debuts
1999 Irish television series endings
1980s Irish television series
1990s Irish television series
Irish television talk shows
RTÉ original programming